Carolyn Virginia Green (born November 6, 1933), also known by her married name Carolyn Lewis, is an American former competition swimmer and two-time Pan American Games gold medalist.

Green represented the United States as an 18-year-old at the 1952 Summer Olympics in Helsinki, Finland.  She competed in the women's 400-meter freestyle, advanced to the event final, and finished fourth in a time of 5:16.5.

Green also swam in two consecutive Pan American Games.  At the 1951 Pan American Games in Buenos Aires, Argentina, she won a gold medal as a member of the winning U.S. team in the women's 4×100-meter freestyle relay, together with American teammates Jackie LaVine, Betty Mullen and Sharon Geary.  Individually, she received a silver medal for her second-place performance in the women's 400-meter freestyle.  Four years later at the 1955 Pan American Games in Mexico City, she again won a gold medal in the women's 4×100-meter freestyle, this time with teammates Judith Roberts, Wanda Werner and Gretchen Gluter.  Once again, she also won a silver medal in the women's 400-meter freestyle.

References

External links
 

1933 births
Living people
American female freestyle swimmers
Olympic swimmers of the United States
Swimmers from Philadelphia
Swimmers at the 1951 Pan American Games
Swimmers at the 1952 Summer Olympics
Swimmers at the 1955 Pan American Games
Pan American Games gold medalists for the United States
Pan American Games silver medalists for the United States
Pan American Games medalists in swimming
Medalists at the 1951 Pan American Games
Medalists at the 1955 Pan American Games
21st-century American women
20th-century American women